Tarek-Shawki El-Sakka (born 11 October 1940) is an Egyptian former tennis player who has been working in the FMCG industry for more than thirty years.

A singles and doubles silver medalist at the 1983 Mediterranean Games, he also played college tennis in the United States for the Southwestern Louisiana Ragin' Cajuns. One of his coaches at the time, Jerry Simmons, said in 2014: "Tarek was the best overall player I had at USL. He could kill you on clay. He was a smart player, and a good doubles player."

References

External links

1962 births
Living people
Egyptian male tennis players
Louisiana Ragin' Cajuns men's tennis players
Mediterranean Games silver medalists for Egypt
Mediterranean Games medalists in tennis
Competitors at the 1963 Mediterranean Games
Egyptian expatriate sportspeople in the United States
Sportspeople from Cairo
20th-century Egyptian people